Establishment may refer to:

 The Establishment, a dominant group or elite that controls a polity or an organization
 The Establishment (club), a 1960s club in London, England
 The Establishment (Pakistan), political terminology for the military deep-state in Pakistan
 Establishment of a state religion or established church
 Establishment, participation in economic life "on a stable and continuous basis" in the European Single Market
 ESTABLISHED, a Transmission Control Protocol connection state

See also
 
 
 Anti-establishment, in opposition to the conventional social, political, and economic principles of a society
 Dissolution (law), with respect to an entity that was previously legally established
 Disestablishmentarianism, a movement to end the Church of England's status as an official church
 Establiments, a residential district in the Balearic Islands
 Establishment Clause of the First Amendment to the United States Constitution, forming the right of freedom of religion
 Establishment Division, the human resource arm of the Government of Pakistan